The men's volleyball tournament at the 2011 Pan Arab Games was held in Doha, Qatar from December 10 to 21, 2011. In this men's tournament 11 teams participated.

Preliminary round

Group A

Group B

Final round

Placement 9th–10th

Placement 7th–8th

Semifinals

Placement 5th–6th

Bronze medal match

Gold medal match

Final standing

References

2011
2011 in volleyball